Clothilde Edwina Louise Shorten (née Bryce; born 1971) is an Australian corporate affairs specialist and the spouse of former Leader of the Opposition Bill Shorten.

Early life and education
Shorten was born in Brisbane in 1971 as the fourth of five children. Her mother is Dame Quentin Bryce who was the Governor General of Australia and her father is Michael Bryce. She grew up in the suburb of St Lucia, containing the University of Queensland where her mother was a law lecturer and tutor. She attended Ironside State School, Somerville House and Indooroopilly State High School. At primary school, she was a friend of future senator Kimberley Kitching.

After high school, she joined the Sunday Mail in Brisbane as a copygirl, and started studying an online degree in communications, through Deakin University in Victoria. She also started, but then never completed an MBA at the University of Queensland.

Career

Between 1993 and 1994 Shorten worked at Lexmark as a marketing assistant. Then in 2000, Shorten began working in communications at Mincom until 2002. From 2005 she then worked for Cement Australia. Recommencing her career in 2014, after a four year break due to rearing their first child together with Bill Shorten, she worked at engineering services company Calibre. She then resigned in 2016 to spend more time with her husband on the election campaign trail.

Shorten's first book Take Heart – A Story for Modern Stepfamilies, was published by Melbourne University Press in 2017.

Her second book, The Secret Ingredient; The Power of the Family Table, about the importance of regular family meals at the kitchen table was published in April 2018.

Shorten describes herself as passionate about equal opportunity and ending family violence. She has been an Ambassador for the Victorian Government's Victoria Against Violence campaign and is a Patron of Our Watch. She is a strategic advisor for the Burnet Institute in Papua New Guinea.

In August 2017 Shorten was appointed to the Board of Industry Funds Services. In 2018, Shorten was appointed as an Ambassador for the Gidget Foundation, whose mission is to raise awareness of perinatal anxiety and depression.

Personal life
Shorten's first marriage was to Brisbane architect Roger Parkin. She sometimes used the surname "Bryce-Parkin" during that time. They were divorced in 2009. She and Parkin have two children who now primarily live with her and Bill Shorten in Melbourne.

She met Bill Shorten in 2007, when she was working in corporate relations in the resource industry and he was the Parliamentary Secretary for Disabilities and Children's Services in the Rudd Government. She moved to Melbourne and married Bill Shorten in November 2009, giving birth to their child in January 2010.

References

External links
 Official website

1971 births
Living people
Australian people of Scottish descent
People from Brisbane
Anti-domestic violence activists